The 1898 Wyoming Cowboys football team represented the University of Wyoming as an independent during the 1898 college football season.  In its third non-consecutive season under head coach Fred Hess, the team compiled a 0–4 record and was outscored by a total of 95 to 8. The season included the first scheduled games with teams from the Colorado School of Mines and the University of Denver. Harry Houston was the team captain for the second consecutive year.

Schedule

References

Wyoming
Wyoming Cowboys football seasons
College football winless seasons
Wyoming Cowboys football